Kit Hain (born 15 December 1956) is a British musician, songwriter and writer. She was a member of the rock duo Marshall Hain and had a solo career as a performer and songwriter.

Musical career
Hain met Julian Marshall while they were pupils at Dartington Hall School, and together they formed the British pop-rock band Marshall Hain. Marshall played the keyboard, while Hain performed vocals and bass. Their 1978 single "Dancing in the City" reached No. 3 in the UK Singles Chart. However, the band split when Julian Marshall found the pressure too much. 

Hain's first release after the duo split was "The Joke's on You", for Harvest Records. She then signed to Deram Records and subsequently Mercury Records for several singles and albums. Hain moved to the United States in 1985 and forged a successful career as a songwriter. Her portfolio includes "Fires of Eden" (Judy Collins, Cher), "Back To Avalon" (Heart), "Rip in Heaven" and "Crash and Burn" ('Til Tuesday), "Further From Fantasy" (Annie Haslam), "Remind My Heart" and "Every Time We Fall" (Lea Salonga).

Her songs have also been recorded by Roger Daltrey, Kiki Dee, Barbara Dickson, Fleetwood Mac, Kim Criswell, Conchita Wurst, Milow and Stan Van Samang.

Writer
Under her married name Kit Grindstaff she writes novels for teens and pre-teens. Her debut, The Flame in the Mist (2013) is a dark fantasy, published by Delacorte Press/Random House Children's Books.

Discography
 Spirits Walking Out (US title: Looking for You) (1981)
 School for Spies (1983)
 Cry Freedom (1995)

References

1956 births
Living people
English pop guitarists
English rock bass guitarists
English rock singers
English songwriters
People educated at Dartington Hall School
Deram Records artists
People from Cobham, Surrey
English women pop singers
20th-century English singers
20th-century English bass guitarists
20th-century English women singers